Shenanigans was a children's television game show produced by Heatter-Quigley Productions which aired on ABC Saturday mornings from September 26, 1964 to March 20, 1965, and again from September 25 to December 18, 1965. The series began as local programming in New York City and later aired nationally on ABC. The show was similar to Video Village Junior, another program produced by Heatter-Quigley which featured children as contestants moving about a life-sized game board.

Stubby Kaye hosted the program, dubbed "the Mayor of Shenanigans," and Kenny Williams was the announcer, known as "Kenny the Cop". Williams portrayed a similar role on Video Village.

Game play
Children stood on a giant game board; a button was pressed that stopped a set of flashing lights with the numbers one through four, and the children advanced on the game board the corresponding number of spaces. The children then answered a question or performed a stunt and earning "Shenaniganzas", scrip that could be traded for items from the Top Value Stamp Catalog. Possible prizes were also suspended from the ceiling in the studio.

Most of the spaces on the game board were references to popular board games by the show's sponsor Milton Bradley Company, such as Operation. In 1964, a board game was published by Milton Bradley as a companion to the show.

See also
Similar game shows that came after Shenanigans:
Finders Keepers
Fun House
Double Dare
Where in the World Is Carmen Sandiego?
Family Game Night

References

External links
 

Milton Bradley Company games
American Broadcasting Company original programming
1960s American children's game shows
1960s American children's television series
1964 American television series debuts
1965 American television series endings
Television series about children
Television series by Heatter-Quigley Productions
Television series by Four Star Television